Monkeyshines is a series of experimental short silent films made to test the original cylinder format of the Kinetoscope, and are believed to be the first films shot in the United States.

Monkeyshines, No. 1 was shot by William K. L. Dickson and William Heise for the Edison labs. Scholars have differing opinions on whether the first was shot in June 1889 starring Fred Ott or at some time between November 21–27, 1890 starring Giuseppe Sacco Albanese. Both men were fellow lab workers at the company; contradictory evidence exists for each claim. Monkeyshines, No. 2 and Monkeyshines, No. 3 quickly followed to test further conditions.

These films were intended to be internal tests of the new camera system, and were not created for commercial use; their rise to prominence resulted much later due to work by film historians.  All three films show a blurry figure in white standing in one place making large gestures and are only a few seconds long. Monkeyshines No. 3 has disappeared and may be lost.

References

External links

 
 
 
 
 
 
 

1889 films
1890 films
1890s American films
Films shot in New Jersey
Films directed by William Kennedy Dickson
Films directed by William Heise
Articles containing video clips
American silent short films
American black-and-white films
1880s short films